The following Union Army units and commanders fought in the Siege of Charleston Harbor of the American Civil War. The Confederate order of battle is listed separately.

The following lists contain the commanders and units involved in the operations against Charleston Harbor from July to September 1863 which included the major engagements of First Fort Wagner, Grimball's Landing, Second Fort Wagner and the Siege of Charleston Harbor.

Abbreviations used

Military ranks
 MG = Major general
 BG = Brigadier general
 Col = Colonel
 Ltc = Lieutenant colonel
 Maj = Major
 Cpt = Captain
 Lt = 1st lieutenant

Other
 w = wounded
 mw = mortally wounded
 k = killed

Initial Operations (July 6–18, 1863)

X Corps (Department of the South)
BG Quincy A. Gillmore

Fort Wagner (July 18, 1863)

Siege Operations (July 18-September 7, 1863)

X Corps, Department of the South (July–August)
BG Quincy A. Gillmore
 Chief of Staff and Artillery: Col John Wesley Turner
 Engineers: Col Edward W. Serrell
 Medical Director: Ltc Augustus C. Hamlin

X Corps, Department of the South (August–September)
MG Quincy A. Gillmore
 Chief of Staff and Artillery: Col John Wesley Turner
 Engineers: Col Edward W. Serrell
 Medical Director: Ltc Augustus C. Hamlin

Naval Blockade

South Atlantic Blockading Squadron

Rear Admiral John A. Dahlgren

See also

 South Carolina in the American Civil War
 United States Colored Troops

Notes

References
U.S. War Department, The War of the Rebellion: a Compilation of the Official Records of the Union and Confederate Armies, U.S. Government Printing Office, 1880–1901.
Eicher, John H., & Eicher, David J., Civil War High Commands, Stanford University Press, 2001, .
Wise, Stephen R., Gate of Hell: Campaign for Charleston Harbor, 1863, University of South Carolina Press, 1994

American Civil War orders of battle
African Americans in the American Civil War
African-American history of the United States military